Henry of Wierzbna (probably before 1270 – 23 September 1319) was a Bishop of Wrocław in Poland in 1302–1319.

Life
He was born into the Wierzbna noble family of Würben toward the end of the 1260s and was the third and youngest son of John, the Castellan of Ryczyna in Silesia.

He was made a Canon of Wrocław on 31 August 1290 and supported King Wenceslaus II of Bohemia and his relative Jan Muskata, Bishop of Kraków in the dynastic struggles of the day.

He was made Bishop in 1302 by Pope Boniface VIII and he was the first of the Bishops of Wroclaw to take the princely title.

His time in office was notable for his organization of a Court of the Inquisition in 1315, the result of which included burning at the stake more than 50 people convicted of heresy in the towns of Wroclaw, Swidnica and Nysa. His inquisition was particularly against Beguines and Beghards.

He died on 23 September 1319. and was buried in the Wrocław Cathedral. Due to competing claims a replacement Bishop was not appointed for seven years following his death and the diocese was administered by his canon Nicholas of Banz.

Further reading
 Colmar Grünhagen : Henry I (of Würben) In:. General German Biography (ADB). Volume 11, Duncker & Humblot, Leipzig, 1880, pp. 507–509. 
 Constantin von Wurzbach:Henry the Younger in:. Biographical Dictionary of the Austrian Empire tape 58.(In German) Verlag L. C. Zamarski, Wien 1889, S. 178. Publisher L. C. Zamarski, Vienna, 1889, p. 178 
 Kurt Engelbert: Heinrich I. v. Würben in the New German Biography (NDB). Volume 8, Duncker & Humblot, Berlin, 1969, p 354 ( digitized )(IN German). 
 Jan Kopiec, in: Erwin Gatz (Ed.): The bishops of the Holy Roman Empire From 1198 to 1448. Duncker & Humblot, Berlin 2001,  page 110.

References

Prince-Bishops of Breslau
13th-century Roman Catholic bishops in Poland
13th-century births
1319 deaths
People from Żarów